Barringer Township is a non-functioning township in Iredell County, North Carolina, United States. By the requirements of the North Carolina Constitution of 1868, the counties were divided into townships, including sixteen in Iredell County.

Geography
Barringer Township covers an area of 30.41 square miles (78.76 km2), and of this, 0.07 square miles (0.18 km2), or 0.23 percent, is water.

Barringer Township lies on the western edge of the Yadkin–Pee Dee River Basin. Bodies of water within Barringer Township include the following.
 I-L Creek
 Kerr Branch
 Rocky Branch
 Weathers Creek
 Withrow Creek

Communities
 Mazeppa, unincorporated
 Mooresville, city (part)
 Statesville, city (part)
 Troutman, town (part)

Adjacent townships
The U.S. Census Bureau shows the following townships adjacent to Barringer.

 Chambersburg (north)
 Mount Ulla, Rowan County (east)
 Coddle Creek (south)
 Davidson (southwest)
 Fallstown (west)
 Statesville Township (northwest)

Transportation

Airports
 Atwell Airport, a private airport with the Federal Aviation Administration (FAA) identifier of 1NC2, owned by Scott Atwell of Mooresville, is within Barringer Township.

Major highways

References

Townships in Iredell County, North Carolina
1868 establishments in North Carolina